Leuzzi is an Italian surname. Notable people with the surname include:

Giuseppe Leuzzi (born 1941), Italian journalist, essayist, and writer
Vincenzo Leuzzi (1909–1983), Italian academic

See also
Luzzi (surname)

Italian-language surnames